The K7015/7016 Harbin-Qiqihar Through Train is Chinese railway running between Harbin to Qiqihar express passenger trains by the Harbin Railway Bureau, Harbin passenger segment responsible for passenger transport task, Habin originating on the Qiqihar train. 25G Type Passenger trains running along the Binzhou Railway and Pingqi Railway across Heilongjiang provinces, the entire 310 km. Harbin West Railway Station to Qiqihar Railway Station running 3 hours and 30 minutes, use trips for K7015; Qiqihar Railway Station to Qiqihar Railway Station Station to run 4 hours and 10 minutes, use trips for K7016.

See also 
Harbin-Qiqihar Through Train

References 

Passenger rail transport in China
Rail transport in Heilongjiang